Dennis Murillo Skrzypiec (born April 28, 1992), simply known as Dennis Murillo, is a Brazilian footballer who plays for Chonburi in Thai League 1.

Honours

Individual
Thai League 1 Best XI: 2020–21

References

External links

1992 births
Living people
Association football forwards
Brazilian expatriate footballers
Brazilian expatriate sportspeople in Thailand
Dennis Murillo
Dennis Murillo
Dennis Murillo
Dennis Murillo
Dennis Murillo
Dennis Murillo
Dennis Murillo
Dennis Murillo
Brazilian footballers
Expatriate footballers in Thailand
Rio Claro Futebol Clube players
Footballers from Curitiba